The 1996–97 Northern Football League season was the 99th in the history of Northern Football League, a football competition in England.

Division One

Division One featured 17 clubs which competed in the division last season, along with three new clubs, promoted from Division Two:
 Easington Colliery
 Morpeth Town
 South Shields

League table

Division Two

Division Two featured 16 clubs which competed in the division last season, along with four new clubs.
 Clubs relegated from Division One:
 Eppleton Colliery Welfare
 Ferryhill Athletic
 Peterlee Newtown
 Plus:
 Jarrow Roofing BCA, joined from the Wearside Football League

League table

References

External links
 Northern Football League official site

Northern Football League seasons
1996–97 in English football leagues